Code for Nepal is an organization which aims to increase digital literacy and the use of open data in Nepal. It was co-founded by Ravi Kumar and Mia Mitchell.

Projects
#IWalkFreely
#Ko Nepali?

References

External links

Non-profit organizations based in Arlington, Virginia
Information technology in Nepal
Nepal–United States relations